Stina Viktorsson (born 27 June 1985) is a Swedish curler from Umeå. She is a skip.

Viktorsson had an accomplished Junior career in Sweden winning a bronze medal at the 2004 World Junior Curling Championships and a silver at the 2005 Juniors (losing to Switzerland's Tania Grivel). Also in 2005, Viktorsson won a silver medal at the European Mixed Curling Championship while playing third for Niklas Edin. Viktorsson's return to the 2006 Juniors was a disappointing one, where she finished in 8th place.

In 2008, Viktorsson qualified for the 2008 Ford World Women's Curling Championship. At the Vernon World Championships she led her team to a sixth-place finish with a 6 - 5 record. She had the third best performance as a skip shooting 77%.

In 2009 she was inducted into the Swedish Curling Hall of Fame.

References

External links
 

Living people
1985 births
Swedish female curlers
European curling champions
Swedish curling champions
Competitors at the 2007 Winter Universiade